is a Japanese screenwriter and novelist that is mostly known for his work on Garo series, Ultraman franchise, and the first three seasons of Pretty Guardian Sailor Moon Crystal series.

Career
Born and raised from Nagano Prefecture, Kobayashi graduated from Japan University's department of Arts and Theater's Film Studies Scenario Writing course. In 2002, Yuji Kobayashi started working as a screenwriter and wrote an anime, Sazae-san. Since then, Kobayashi has written scripts for various tokusatsu, anime and novelized products, such as Garo, and Ultraman franchise. He is also a part time teacher at his alma-mater.

In 2014, after writing various episodes for Suite PreCure, Smile PreCure and Saint Seiya Omega anime series, Kobayashi was chosen as a head writer for the Sailor Moon reboot series, titled Pretty Guardian Sailor Moon Crystal. He was involved in the anime until the end of its third season.

In 2020, Kobayashi wrote the anime film adaptation of Fushigi Dagashiya Zenitendō, as well the television series.

Filmography

TV Tokusatsu

Live-action film

TV Anime

Anime film

Web Anime

Bibliography

Novel

Manga

References

External links
 via Japan Creator Bank

1979 births
Living people
People from Nagano Prefecture
Japanese screenwriters
Japanese novelists